Nicole (also known as Crazed and The Widow's Revenge) is a 1978 American thriller directed by Istvan Ventilla and starring Leslie Caron and Catherine Bach.

Plot
Nicole (Leslie Caron) is a wealthy, reclusive widow who lives alone with her murderous chauffeur Malcolm (Ramon Bieri). When she falls for Fletcher (Bruce Graziano), a successful car salesman, and makes friends with Sue (Catherine Bach), a young dancer, things begin to turn out for the better. However, when she begins to suspect that Fletcher is cheating on her, she snaps and slips into an "alternate reality of violence, sex and paranoia".

References

External links
 
 
  Crazed – at the Troma Entertainment movie database
 Crazed (The Widow's Revenge) at the Turner Classic Movies

1978 films
American independent films
Troma Entertainment films
1970s erotic thriller films
Films produced by Michael Laughlin
American erotic thriller films
1970s English-language films
1970s American films